The 1986 Australian 2.0 Litre Touring Car Championship was a CAMS sanctioned Australian motor racing title open to Group A Touring Cars of under 2.0 litre engine capacity. The championship was won by John Smith, driving a Toyota Corolla.

The title was the first of three Australian 2.0 Litre Touring Car Championships to be awarded by the Confederation of Australian Motor Sport with the second held in 1987. The championship was revived in 1993 for drivers of cars in the 2 Litre division of the 1993 Australian Touring Car Championship.

Calendar
The championship was contested over a five-round series.

Championship results

References

Further reading
 The Australian Touring Car Championship: 30 Fabulous Years, 1990

Australian Touring Car Championship
Touring Cars
Australian 2.0 Litre Touring Car Championship